The 1912–13 season was the 36th Scottish football season in which Dumbarton competed at national level, entering the Scottish Football League, the Scottish Cup and the Scottish Qualifying Cup.

Scottish League

Dumbarton's seventh successive season in the Second Division saw their worst performance since their return to league football in 1906, but still managed a 6th place finish with 29 points, 5 behind champions Ayr United.

An expansion of the First Division from 18 to 20 clubs meant that there would be at least 2 places available to Second Division clubs in the end of season election.  As it was both the bottom 'top flight' clubs - Partick Thistle and Queen's Park - were to retain their places, and in addition to Ayr United, the Second Division champions, it was Dumbarton that would step up to the First Division - beating Cowdenbeath with the chairman's casting vote.

Scottish Cup

The Scottish Cup campaign saw Dumbarton disposing of First Division opponents before losing to eventual champions Falkirk in the fourth round.

Scottish Qualifying Cup
Dumbarton qualified for the Scottish Cup by reaching the semi final of the Scottish Qualifying Cup before losing to non-league Nithsdale Wanderers.

Friendlies
During the season, 3 'friendly' matches were played, winning 1, drawing 1 and losing 1, scoring 4 goals and conceding 4.

Player statistics

|}

Source:

Transfers

Players in

Players out 

Source:

In addition John Brown, George Hunter, Thomas Howat, John MacAulay, William Main, Robert Muirhead, Ebennezer Rodger, John Stalker, John Stewart and John Wilson all played their final 'first XI' games in Dumbarton colours.

Reserve Team
Dumbarton lost in the second round of the Scottish Second XI Cup to Kilmarnock.

References

Dumbarton F.C. seasons
Scottish football clubs 1912–13 season